Niall O'Brien (born 1994) is an Irish hurler who plays as a right corner-forward for the Westmeath senior team.

O'Brien made his first appearance for the team during the 2012 championship and immediately became a regular member of the starting fifteen.

At club level O'Brien plays with the Castletown Geoghegan club.

Career statistics

References

1994 births
Date of birth missing (living people)
Living people
Castletown Geoghegan hurlers
Westmeath inter-county hurlers